

Specifications
Box Color: Navy Blue
Edge: Reeded
Weight: 26.73 grams
Diameter: 38.1 millimeters
Composition: 90% Silver, 10% Copper
Silver Content: 0.77344 ounces

About this commemorative
The John Marshall Commemorative Dollar was issued in 2005 making it a modern commemorative. The Obverse depicts a profile of John Marshall and was designed by John Mercanti. The reverse shows the interior of the Supreme Court Chamber during the time Marshall was a justice.

Mints
Proof and Uncirculated
400,000 (P - Philadelphia Mint in Philadelphia, Pennsylvania)

See also
 
 
 United States commemorative coins
 List of United States commemorative coins and medals (2000s)

References
United States Mint Certificate of Authenticity for the John Marshall Commemorative Dollar

Currencies introduced in 2005
John Marshall
Modern United States commemorative coins